Doña María Tomasa Palafox y Portocarrero, Marquise of Villafranca and Duchess of Medina Sidonia (1780–1835), was a patron and muse of the painter Francisco de Goya y Lucientes and the wife of Francisco de Borja Álvarez de Toledo, 12th Marquis of Villafranca.

In his famous painting, Goya portrays the Marchioness de Villafranca as an artist with brush and maulstick in her hand. She has interrupted her work at the easel and leaning back in her armchair, she is scrutinising her model, her husband—invisible to the viewer—who is posing for his portrait. He must have been seated facing sideways with his profile to the artist, unable to turn the attention to his wife until the picture was done. Goya honoured his aristocratic "colleague" with the inscription of her name on the palette; he himself signed his work with his signature on the arm of the chair. The marchioness, who is fashionably dressed in the Empire style, was certainly more than just a dabbler in art. She was an honorary member of the Madrid Academy, which also honoured her with an award.

Ancestors

References

1780 births
1835 deaths
Maria Tomosa
House of Medina Sidonia
Palafox y Portocarrero, Maria
Spanish art patrons
19th-century philanthropists